Caloocan station (also called Sangandaan station) is a railway station located on the North Main Line in Caloocan, Metro Manila, Philippines. It is rebuilt from its original location, now situated adjacent to the Caloocan railway depot, near Samson Road.

History
The station was originally part of the railway line operated by Manila Railroad Company connecting Manila to northern Luzon that commenced operations on March 24, 1891. It was the first railroad station serving Caloocan, which was then a town of Manila province at the time of its opening. It was described a key entry point of the railway line to the north and central Luzon. On August 31, 1898, the general order in response to Manila Railroad Company general manager Thomas Higgins's request to continue operations despite the Spanish–American War, General Emilio Aguinaldo ordered his troops to guard the Caloocan station facility and inspect its coaches and trainsets located inside the station.

The station was abandoned in 1997 after services to Meycauayan ceased, but was supposed to be replaced by a new one in as a result of the rehabilitation of PNR Southrail and the Northrail project, a rebuilding of the line from Manila to Pampanga which would partly use the old right-of-way. The project commenced in 2007, construction has halted though as of 2011 and underwent many renegotiation, including a litigation as a result of the cancellation with the Chinese contractor. On 2017, Caloocan and 16 other stations situated on the abandoned line would be rebuilt as part of the newly revitalized elevated Northrail system serving from Tutuban in Manila to Clark in Pampanga, reviving its use once again as a railway station.

In conjunction, PNR reopened the Caloocan segment as part of the new at-grade Caloocan-Dela Rosa line, on August 1, 2018. However, boarding and alighting from this station was not yet possible then, as the location is very near the staging facilities for the construction of NLEX Segment 10.1. It had to be cleared and reconditioned for reactivation by the PNR, which took more than a month. Upon upgrading the line to stop at FTI instead of Dela Rosa station, PNR reopened the station to passengers on September 10, after many years of closure.

The rails beyond this station to the north was dismantled and replaced with standard gauge tracks for the ill-fated NorthRail project. The same standard gauge tracks were also dismantled during the construction of the overhead viaduct for the NLEX Segment 10.1. In 2017, the NorthRail right of way was modified, reinstating the at-grade tracks in tandem with an elevated railway leading to Clark. PNR has since been steadily reinstating the at-grade rails and service with the old Acacia railway station (renamed as Governor Pascual railway station) at Gov. Pascual Avenue in Malabon being rebuilt, along with its railtracks.

The level crossing on Samson Road was restored on November 23, 2018, which enables the PNR to serve Malabon once again. Services to Governor Pascual resumed on December 3, 2018, after two decades of hiatus.

The original Caloocan Railway Station, located facing what is now the Caloocan depot and considered historical, was partially demolished in 2019 for the North Luzon Expressway Harbor Link or Segment 10, and its rail tracks severed from the main line for some time. The partial demolition garnered complaints from historians and train enthusiasts. The original station sits beside the current girder storage facility for Leighton Builders, the contractors of the NLEX Segment 10, between the present locations of 10th Avenue railway station and the new station along Samson Road.

Nearby landmarks
The station is near major landmarks such as SM Center Sangandaan, Sangandaan Police Station, Caloocan Post Office, Caloocan Central Fire Station and schools such as University of the East Caloocan, STI College Caloocan, AMA Computer College-Caloocan and Andres Bonifacio Elementary School.

Transportation links
The station is accessible by jeepneys plying the C4-Samson Road route starting from Malabon and Navotas through Bonifacio Monument and Manila Central University in Caloocan, as well as those plying the nearby A. Mabini and M.H. Del Pilar Streets.

Station Layout

References

Philippine National Railways stations
Railway stations in Metro Manila
Buildings and structures in Caloocan